Riyue Township (Mandarin: 日月藏族乡) is a township in Huangyuan County, Xining, Qinghai, China. In 2010, Riyue Township had a total population of 13,315: 7,011 males and 6,304 females: 2,480 aged under 14, 10,048 aged between 15 and 65 and 787 aged over 65.

References 

Xining
Township-level divisions of Qinghai
Ethnic townships of the People's Republic of China